Stanley Roger Smith (born December 14, 1946) is an American former professional tennis player. Smith is best known to non-tennis players as the namesake of a popular brand of tennis shoes. A world No. 1 player and two-time major singles champion (at the 1971 US Open and 1972 Wimbledon Championships), Smith also paired with Bob Lutz to create one of the most successful doubles teams of all-time. In 1970, Smith won the inaugural year-end championships title. In 1972, he was the year-end world No. 1 singles player. In 1973, he won his second and last year end championship title at the Dallas WCT Finals. In addition, he won four Grand Prix Championship Series titles. In his early years he improved his tennis game through lessons from Pancho Segura, the Pasadena Tennis Patrons, and the sponsorship of the Southern California Tennis Association headed by Perry T. Jones. Since 2011, Smith has served as President of the International Tennis Hall of Fame.

Career
Smith grew up in Pasadena, California and was coached mainly by Pancho Segura. He played collegiate tennis at the University of Southern California (USC), under Coach George Toley, where he was a three-time All-American and won the 1968 NCAA Singles Championship as well as the 1967 and 1968 doubles titles. At USC, Smith was a member of Beta Theta Pi fraternity's Gamma Tau chapter.

As a kid, he went to get a job as a ball boy for the Davis Cup, but was turned down because the organizers thought he was too clumsy.

In 1971 Smith and John Newcombe were joint recipients of The Martini and Rossi Award, voted for by 11 journalists and were co-ranked world No. 1 by Judith Elian. In 1972 Smith won the 'Martini and Rossi' Award, voted for by a panel of journalists and was ranked world No. 1 by Elian, Tingay, World Tennis, Collins, Frank Rostron and Rex Bellamy.

In his 1979 testing autobiography, Jack Kramer, the long-time tennis promoter and great player himself, ranked Smith as one of the 21 best players of all time.

In 2005, TENNIS magazine ranked Smith as 35th in its "40 Greatest Players of the TENNIS Era".

Smith was inducted into the International Tennis Hall of Fame in 1987.

Following his playing career, Smith became active as a coach for the United States Tennis Association. He has his own tennis academy with Billy Stearns, located on Hilton Head Island, South Carolina.

In 1974, Smith married Princeton University tennis player Marjory Gengler. They later mentored South African tennis player Mark Mathabane, helping increase pressure on the South African government to end apartheid. Smith lives in Hilton Head with his wife and four children, all of whom competed in collegiate tennis.

Tennis shoes
To non-tennis players, Stan Smith is probably best known for the line of tennis shoes which Adidas renamed after him in 1978. Although the Adidas Stan Smith shoe is not recommended for modern tennis playing, it continues to be a widely available iconic fashion brand.

Grand Slam finals

Singles: 3 (2 titles, 1 runner-up)

Doubles: 13 (5 titles, 8 runner-ups)

Career finals
Note: Smith won 10 titles before the Open Era

Singles: 95 (64 titles, 31 runner-ups)

 * 48 Open Era titles listed by the ATP website

Doubles (54 titles, 27 runner-ups)

Grand Slam performance timeline

Singles

References

Further reading
 
 Little Pancho (2009) by Caroline Seebohm
 The Golden Age of College Tennis (2009) by George Toley

External links
 
 
 
 

1946 births
Living people
American male tennis players
American tennis coaches
Australian Open (tennis) champions
People from Hilton Head, South Carolina
Pasadena High School (California) alumni
Sportspeople from Pasadena, California
Tennis commentators
International Tennis Hall of Fame inductees
Tennis people from California
Tennis people from South Carolina
US Open (tennis) champions
USC Trojans men's tennis players
Wimbledon champions
Grand Slam (tennis) champions in men's singles
Grand Slam (tennis) champions in men's doubles
ATP number 1 ranked doubles tennis players
World number 1 ranked male tennis players
Adidas people